NBK may refer to any one of the following:
 Nabeya Bi-tech Kaisha, a Japanese company
 Nandamuri Balakrishna, an Indian acting legend and Politician
 National Bank of Kenya
 National Bank of Kuwait
 Natural Born Killers, a 1994 motion picture
 Natural Born Killers also "inspired" many copycat crimes often attributed to the film
 Neuer Berliner Kunstverein, the New Berlin Art Association
 Nordhordland B.K., a Norwegian football club
 Suvarnabhumi Airport, Bangkok, Thailand, temporary IATA code c.2006
 Nastyboy Klick, the former name of hip hop group NB Ridaz
 Nükleer Başlıklı Kız, a Turkish band from Ankara